Jaivet Ealom is a Toronto-based author, former refugee, refugee advocate, and the only person known to have escaped from Manus Island Detention Centre in Papua New Guinea.

Early life 
Ealom was born in Myanmar where he faced persecution, as a Rohingya ethnic minority.

In Myanmar, he studied industrial chemistry.

Life as a fugitive and refugee

Escape from Myanmar 
In 2013 Ealom took a boat to Jakarta, Indonesia. During the journey he nearly drowned, but was pulled from water by fishermen. From Jakarta, Ealom attempted to sail to Australia. During the journey, Prime Minister Kevin Rudd announced that Australia would not accept refugees arriving by boat.

Ealom was intercepted by Australian authorities, and subsequently imprisoned. He spent six months on Christmas Island before being transferred to Manus Island Processing Centre, aged 21 years.

Detention and escape from Manus Island 
In May 2017, after three and a half years of detention, a suicide attempt, a brief hunger strike, and serious injuries from an attack, Ealom orchestrated his escape.

Using tricks he learned watching Prison Break, including tracking his guards’ schedules, and posing as an interpreter, he managed to exit the center. Assisted by supportive detention center staff, he purchased and boarded a flight to Port Moresby, Papua New Guinea.

Journey to Canada 
From Port Moresby he flew to the Solomon Islands where he learned the local Tok Pisin (Pijin English), pretended he was local and obtained a Solomon Islands' passport. As Solomon Islands is a Commonwealth country, it was possible for him to purchase visa-free travel from Solomon Islands to Canada. During that journey, he was intercepted and suspected of illegal border crossing in Fiji and Hong Kong but persuaded officials to let him continue his journey.

Ealom arrived in Toronto on 24 December 2018 with no money and slept in a homeless shelter.

Life in Canada 
Ealom wrote a memoir about his journey, Escape from Manus, in 2020.

Ealom works at NeedsList in Toronto, studies Political Economy at University of Toronto, and volunteers with the Canadian Rohingya Development Initiative.

References 

Living people
Rohingya people
Rohingya diaspora
Political prisoners
Stateless people
21st-century Burmese writers
21st-century Canadian non-fiction writers
Year of birth missing (living people)